The 1911 Adelaide Carnival was the second edition of the Australasian Football Carnival, an Australian football interstate competition. It took place from 2 to 12 August at Adelaide Oval.

A crowd of 20,000 witnessed South Australia convincingly defeat Victoria in the final to win the championship.

Organisation 
Home state South Australia was joined by teams representing Victoria, Western Australia, Tasmania and New South Wales. Two teams which had competed in the 1908 Melbourne Carnival – Queensland and New Zealand – did not send teams in 1911.

The five teams competed in a single division, each playing the others once. The state with the best record from those games would win the tournament; or, if two teams shared the best record, a final would have been staged. All games were played at Adelaide Oval.

The carnival made a small profit, taking £1,100 at the gate across six days of play, compared with the visiting teams' expenses of £1,025.

Squads

Victoria 

Sharp was not selected in the original squad, but was called up due to injuries and absences in the primary squad. Sharp was in Adelaide because Collingwood and North Adelaide played an exhibition match during the week of the carnival.

Western Australia 

The Western Australian chose its squad from an even split of twelve players from the West Australian Football League and twelve players from the Goldfields Football League.

South Australia

Tasmania

New South Wales 

The New South Wales squad comprised seventeen players from Sydney and eight players from Broken Hill.

Results

Matches

Saturday 2 August

Saturday 5 August

Monday 7 August

Wednesday 9 August

Thursday 10 August

Saturday 12 August

Ladder

Footnotes

External links 
 1911 Adelaide Carnival page on Fullpointsfooty

Australian rules interstate football
Adelaide Carnival, 1911
August 1911 sports events